Eccellenza Umbria is the regional Eccellenza football division for clubs in the northern Italian region of Umbria, Italy. It is competed among 16 teams, in one group. The winners of the Groups are promoted to Serie D. The club who finishes second also have the chance to gain promotion, they are entered into a national play-off which consists of two rounds.

Champions
Here are the past champions of the Umbria Eccellenza, organised into their respective seasons.

1991–92 Pontevecchio
1992–93 Città di Castello
1993–94 Sansepolcro
1994–95 Nestor Marsciano
1995–96 Ellera
1996–97 Gubbio
1997–98 Orvietana
1998–99 Tiberis Umbertide
1999–2000 Todi
2000–01 Orvietana
2001–02 Angelana
2002–03 Foligno
2003–04 Voluntas Spoleto
2004–05 Narnese
2005–06 Arrone
2006–07 Pontevecchio
2007–08 Deruta
2008–09 Group Città di Castello
2009–10 Todi
2010–11 Pierantonio
2011–12 Bastia
2012–13 Narnese
2013–14 Villabiagio
2014–15 Città di Castello
2015–16 Trestina
2016–17 Villabiagio
2017–18 Bastia
2018–19 Foligno
2019–20 Tiferno Lerchi
2020–21 Not awarded
2021–22 Orvietana

References

External links
Some Club Histories In the League

Sport in Umbria
Umb
Football clubs in Italy
Sports leagues established in 1991
1991 establishments in Italy
Association football clubs established in 1991